Joshua Gregory Cooke is an American actor, songwriter, comedian and musician.

Personal life
Cooke was born in Philadelphia and attended Harriton High School, a small public high school in suburban Rosemont. He was a member of Harriton Theater Company and directed a show his senior year. He has received acting awards including the James Pendleton Foundation Prize for Outstanding Achievement in Performance and the Judith & Milton R. Stark Scholarship. Cooke graduated from the University of California, Los Angeles in 2004, where he majored in theater. He has been married to Eleisha Eagle since April 2011.

Acting career

Television
He played the lead role of Nate Solomon in NBC's 2005 sitcom Committed. He appeared in guest roles on Without a Trace, Century City, Once and Again, 10-8, and Dragnet.

In 2006, he starred in Four Kings, and Big Day, neither of which was renewed. He appeared in Curb Your Enthusiasm. In 2009, Cooke appeared in the Joss Whedon show Dollhouse as Leo Carpenter.

He played Dan Stonewater on the final episode of Scrubs and Rabbi Feldman on the final episode of The King of Queens. In 2009, Cooke played Auggie Harris in Season 6 Episode 7 on Numbers. Cooke played Ben Coles on Better with You, a sitcom which began in 2010 and was cancelled after 22 episodes.

Cooke voiced various characters in Seth Green's Robot Chicken and made an appearance in the hit Showtime series Dexter as Louis Greene.

Cooke played Joel Stevens, boyfriend of Rachel Bilson's character Zoe Hart, in CW's Hart of Dixie (season 3) and appears as Sue Heck's college professor on whom she has a strong crush in the seventh season of The Middle.

In 2018, he guest starred as Greg in Younger as Caitlin's older boyfriend and as Barry, father to Sheldon's perceived rival, in Young Sheldon. He played Mallory Hanson's boyfriend, Daniel Penbraith for a while in Grace and Frankie.
He portrayed Reeves in Castle Rock. He also guest starred as Mason in episode 9 of season 2 of The Marvelous Mrs. Maisel.

In 2020, appeared as journalist Loudon Wainwright Jr. in the Disney Plus series The Right Stuff.

Film
In 2006, Cooke co-starred in the film Wasted as Dixon, alongside Eddie Kaye Thomas and Kip Pardue. Cooke also played Christina Milian's love interest, Eddie, in Snowglobe. He played Eric in Young People Fucking (2007). He appeared in the 2010 film A Fork in the Road. He had a small role in I Love You, Man as Alan, a straight married man in a relationship with Robbie Klaven (played by Andy Samberg). Cooke was one of the lead roles in the 2011 horror film Quarantine 2: Terminal.

Cooke starred as Andy in the 2010 comedy Group Sex, alongside Greg Grunberg and Odette Yustman. Cooke played the lead role as Ron in the 2008 direct-to-DVD film Bachelor Party 2: The Last Temptation.

Theatre
In 2016, Cooke was cast in the La Jolla Playhouse premiere of Pulitzer Prize winner and Tony Award nominee Ayad Akhtar's Junk: The Golden Age of Debt as "Robert Merkin." It will be directed by Tony Award winner Doug Hughes and premiere on July 26, 2016.

Music
On November 10, 2015, Cooke released his debut album 'fō under the stage name "fō". It was executively produced by Cooke and Erik Kertes.

Filmography

Film

Television

References

External links
 

21st-century American male actors
American male film actors
American male television actors
Harriton High School alumni
Living people
Male actors from Philadelphia
UCLA Film School alumni
Year of birth missing (living people)